Catephia triphaenoides is a species of moth of the  family Erebidae. It is found in Madagascar.

References

Catephia
Moths described in 1965
Moths of Africa